Therese Svendsen (born Malmö, March 13, 1989) is a Swedish swimmer representing SK Ran.

Biography
She is a former holder of the Swedish record in short-course 200 m backstroke, and swam for Sweden at the 2007 World Championships (backstroke events).

As of 2008, she is attending/swimming for the USA's Southern Methodist University.

She competed in the 2012 Summer Olympics, where she finished 35th in the 100 metre backstroke event.

References

Swedish female backstroke swimmers
1989 births
Living people
Olympic swimmers of Sweden
Swimmers at the 2012 Summer Olympics
Medalists at the FINA World Swimming Championships (25 m)
European Aquatics Championships medalists in swimming
Sportspeople from Malmö
21st-century Swedish women